Cadron Settlement Park (archaically Cadron) is a 150-acre (61 ha) public park located in Conway, Arkansas. It is operated by the city of Conway under a lease from the Corps of Engineers. The public park was established on October 14, 1979, and features a reconstructed blockhouse, boat launch, hiking trails, restrooms, picnic areas, pavilion, handicapped trails and parking areas, and interpretive signs. The Faulkner County Historical Society hosts public events in the blockhouse.

See also
 Butterfield Overland Mail in Arkansas and Missouri
 National Register of Historic Places listings in Faulkner County, Arkansas

References

External links

 Cadron Settlement at Encyclopedia of Arkansas
 Cadron Settlement Park at Arkansas Department of Parks, Heritage, and Tourism

1979 establishments in Arkansas
Archaeological sites on the National Register of Historic Places in Arkansas
Arkansas Heritage Trails System
Buildings and structures on the Arkansas River
Butterfield Overland Mail stations
Former county seats in Arkansas
Former populated places in Arkansas
National Register of Historic Places in Faulkner County, Arkansas
Open-air museums in Arkansas
Parks in Conway, Arkansas
Pre-statehood history of Arkansas
Protected areas established in 1979
Trading posts in the United States
Trail of Tears